Gangbuster is a comic book fictional character, a DC Comics superhero. He first appeared as Jose Delgado in Adventures of Superman #428 (May 1987), and as Gangbuster in Adventures of Superman #434 (November 1987). He was created by Marv Wolfman and Jerry Ordway.

Fictional character biography

Gangbuster I
Jose Delgado grew up in the Metropolis area known as Suicide Slum. As he grew older he became a skilled boxer. He went into teaching and ended up as a high school teacher in Metropolis. He became a mentor to Jerry White (the son of Perry White). When Lex Luthor enlisted youth gangs into organized crime under his control, Jose adopted the identity of Gangbuster to deal with the threat posed to the teenagers in his community.

Jose Delgado suffered a spinal injury while saving Lois Lane's life during a fight with a creature called Combattor (ironically, Luthor had secretly created Combattor with the intention of framing Superman for the damage caused in Combattor's rampage, but Gangbuster's efforts not only contained Combattor but also caused him to collapse when the implants that gave him his strength had negative consequences on his health). Delgado was hospitalized and talked into retiring by Cat Grant. He recovered the ability to walk with the assistance of a LexCorp cybernetic implant, similar to the implant later used on Maximum from the Supermen of America.

Delgado later discovered someone else was masquerading as Gangbuster, and using much more violent methods. This turned out to be an amnesiac Superman, who was suffering from a nervous breakdown after a fight with Brainiac.

After recovering, Delgado discovered that the implant which enabled him to walk was a LexCorp invention, and that Lex Luthor could use it to take control of his body. Luthor forced Gangbuster to attack an ally of Superman's named Professor Emil Hamilton. Hamilton was later able to successfully alter the implant, allowing Jose to take control of his life again. Delgado's life later fell apart and he had trouble keeping jobs.

Delgado had limited personal relationships with Cat Grant. They became very close while he served as her bodyguard, but he did not get along with her young son Adam. Delgado resumed his career as Gangbuster following Superman's apparent death at the hands of Doomsday. He got into trouble when he broke up a drug deal only to discover that it was part of an undercover police operation. Pursued by the police, he went on the run.

An ultraviolent Gangbuster later showed up in Black Lightning's hometown of Brick City. Black Lightning discovered that this wasn't the real Gangbuster, but a shapeshifter named Ishmael, an operative of Tobias Whale. The real Jose Delgado Gangbuster soon showed up and later helped him defeat Ishmael and his shapeshifter brother Queequeg.

Gangbuster returned in issue #1 of the weekly mini-series known as Trinity. In issue #5 he debuted an updated version of his body armor with a portable arsenal of non-lethal weaponry. He was forced out of retirement by witnessing the kidnapping of mystic Tarot (to whom he appointed himself guardian). Jose soon tracked Tarot to the castle headquarters of Despero, Morgana Le Fey and the villain known as Enigma. He and Hawkman infiltrated the castle and spend days fighting through its denizens, as time and space were much different inside from outside. They rescued Tarot from a trio of stone monsters. At the end of the series, with reality returned to normal, Gangbuster and Tarot began a relationship.

In the Supergirl series, Gangbuster and Dr. Light (Kimiyo Hoshi)—both employees of S.T.A.R. Labs—help Supergirl rescue her friend Lana Lang after her body is possessed by the Insect Queen.

Gangbuster and Dr. Light investigate an object that crashes into a Metropolis park and leaves a massive crystallized crater in its center. While searching the crater, the two heroes discover a Bizarro Supergirl. The Bizarro Supergirl takes Gangbuster and Dr. Light hostage, but is ultimately defeated in battle by the real Supergirl.

Gangbuster II
During DC Rebirth, Jose's niece is introduced named Rebekah and assumes the role of Gangbuster II.

Powers and abilities
Jose Delgado has no superpowers but is a skilled martial artist and gymnast. When Jose was crippled on duty as the Gangbuster, he was forced to accept Lex Luthor's agreement and treatment to return the function of his legs to him using cybernetic enhancement. However, Luthor's cybernetic components also allowed him to control Jose's movement if necessary.

Other versions
In the alternate "Trinity" universe, Gangbuster is one of the few entities to recognize and understand reality is not as it should be. He allies himself with that universe's version of Alfred Pennyworth.

References

External links
DCU Guide: Gangbuster
DCU Guide chronology: Gangbuster
DCU Guide additional chronology: Gangbuster
Superman Homepage: Gangbuster
Cosmic Teams: Cat Grant

Latin American superheroes
Characters created by Jerry Ordway
DC Comics male superheroes
DC Comics martial artists
Fictional boxers
Fictional schoolteachers
Fictional Hispanic and Latino American people
Comics characters introduced in 1987
Characters created by Marv Wolfman
Vigilante characters in comics
Comics characters introduced in 2021
de:Nebenfiguren im Superman-Universum#Gangbuster